The Northern Line is a commuter rail service in South Africa that in the Cape Town metropolitan area and its surroundings and is operated by Metrorail Western Cape. Northern Line services operate from central Cape Town to Bellville, and then from Bellville along three different routes. The first route runs along the main Cape Town–De Aar railway line to Paarl and Wellington. The second route passes through Stellenbosch to terminate at Muldersvlei station on the main line, while the third also passes through Somerset West to terminate in Strand.

Since March 2020 most of this line has not been operated. Maintenance has not been carried out and parts of the line are stolen or vandalised and not replaced. Communication by the operator is scarce, but when given often overly optimistic on its ability to return the service to its former shape. For all intends and purposes - this line was operated as a commuter service in the past - the entire portion past Bellville is defunct.

Route
Most Northern Line trains travel from Cape Town station along the old main line through Salt River, Maitland, Goodwood and Parow to Bellville station. Trains on the Wellington route continue from Bellville along the main line through Brackenfell and Kraaifontein, and then through the farmland outside the metropolitan area to reach the towns of Paarl and Wellington.

Other trains branch south-east after Bellville, passing through Kuils River to Eerste River; From there, some turn north to pass through Stellenbosch and terminate at Muldersvlei station on the main line, while others continue south-east through Somerset West along the line towards Caledon. Shortly after Somerset West they branch from this line to terminate at Strand on the False Bay coast.

The Northern Line also includes a service along the relief main line from Cape Town past Century City and Monte Vista to Bellville.

Station listing
The Northern line serves the following stations:

Operation
The line is made up of  track, electrified with 3,000 V DC overhead catenary; most of the routes are at least double track, except for the Strand and Stellenbosch lines beyond Eerste River. Services are operated mostly by electric multiple units of Class 5M2.

References

Metrorail (South Africa)
Railway lines in South Africa
3 ft 6 in gauge railways in South Africa